Vladislav Vladimirovich Borisov (born 5 September 1978) is a Russian former cyclist. He competed in the team pursuit at the 2000 and 2004 Olympics.

In 2007 he won the Russian National Road Race Championships.

Major results

1996
 1st  Points race, UCI Junior Track World Championships
1999
 1st Stage 9 Vuelta al Táchira
 3rd  Team pursuit, UCI Track World Championships
2001
 1st Stage 7 Tour de Pologne
 3rd Memorial Manuel Galera
 5th Circuito de Getxo
2002
 4th Road race, National Road Championships
2003
 National Road Championships
3rd Time trial
4th Road race
 7th Overall Tour de Normandie
 8th Overall Tour de Gironde
 9th Boucle de l'Artois
2004
 4th Overall Tour de Serbie
2005
 1st Stage 1 Tour of Qinghai Lake
 1st Stage 2 Okolo Slovenska
 2nd Overall Five Rings of Moscow
1st Stage 4
 3rd Time trial, National Road Championships
 5th Overall Tour of South China Sea
 9th Overall Paris–Corrèze
1st Stage 2
2006
 3rd Memorial Oleg Dyachenko
 7th Boucle de l'Artois
2007
 National Road Championships
1st  Road race
5th Time trial
2008
 3rd Coppa Bernocchi
2009
 4th Overall Univest Grand Prix
1st Stage 1 (TTT)
2010
 2nd Trofeo Melinda
 5th Coppa Agostoni
2011
 1st Trophée de la Maison Royale, Challenge du Prince

References

External links
 
 

1978 births
Living people
Russian male cyclists
Olympic cyclists of Russia
Cyclists at the 2000 Summer Olympics
Cyclists at the 2004 Summer Olympics
Russian track cyclists
Sportspeople from Nenets Autonomous Okrug
People from Naryan-Mar